Ateli railway station is a station on the Delhi–Narnaul line. It is located in the Indian state of Haryana. It serves Ateli and surrounding areas.

The railway station
It was allotted the railway code of AEL under the jurisdiction of Bikaner railway division.

History

In 1876, metre-gauge track from Delhi to Rewari and further to Narnaul was laid in 1873 by Indian Railway.

References

Mahendragarh
Delhi railway division